Eulagisca macnabi is a scale worm that occurs in the Antarctic Ocean, the Amundsen Sea and off the South Orkney Islands at depths of about 300 to 1500m.

Description
Eulagisa macnabi most likely has 15 pairs of elytra that have a marginal fringe of papillae. It is brown-pigmented, especially on bases of parapodia and elytrophores. Lateral antennae are inserted terminally on anterior margin of prostomium. The notochaetae are distinctly thicker than the neurochaetae, but bidentate neurochaetae are absent.

References

Phyllodocida